Trenear is a hamlet in the parish of Wendron in Cornwall, England, United Kingdom.

The name of the hamlet comes from the Cornish language words tre 'farm, settlement', an 'the', and yer 'chickens'.

References

Hamlets in Cornwall